Papasena is a Lakes Plain language of Irian Jaya, Indonesia. Ethnologue reports a 23% lexical similarity with Sikaritai, another East Tariku language.

References

Central Lakes Plain languages
Languages of western New Guinea